"Home Ain't Where His Heart Is (Anymore)" is a song co-written and recorded by Canadian country music artist Shania Twain. It was released in July 1996 as the seventh single from her second studio album The Woman in Me. It was written by Twain and Robert John "Mutt" Lange. The song became the first from The Woman in Me not to reach the top 20 of the country charts. "Home Ain't Where His Heart Is (Anymore)" was also included in a medley on Twain's Come on Over Tour.

Critical reception
Billboard reviewed the song favorably, calling it a "powerfully affecting ballad" and praising Twain's "sensitive treatment."

Music video
The music video for "Home Ain't Where His Heart Is" was shot in Montreal, Quebec and directed by Steven Goldmann. It was filmed on July 9, 1996 and debuted on July 24, 1996 on CMT. The video features Twain as a struggling wife and mother, and shows the hard times she is going through as described in the song especially as her husband leaves her and their young baby near the end. The set consisting of a kitchen and bedroom has the walls only partially built with bricks surrounded by trees and curtains, with a rain scene near the end depicting Twain's crumbling relationship with her husband. The video is shot in black and white with occasional tinted shots and is available on Twain's DVD The Platinum Collection.

Chart performance 
"Home Ain't Where His Heart Is (Anymore)" debuted on the Billboard Hot Country Singles & Tracks chart the week of August 10, 1996 at  number 66. The song spent 14 weeks on the chart and climbed to a peak position of  number 28 on October 5, 1996, where it remained for one week. The single became Twain's first from The Woman in Me to miss the top 20.

Official versions
Album Version (4:12)
Radio Edit (3:59)

Charts

Year-end charts

Notes

1996 singles
1996 songs
Shania Twain songs
Songs written by Robert John "Mutt" Lange
Song recordings produced by Robert John "Mutt" Lange
Country ballads
Songs written by Shania Twain
Mercury Records singles
Mercury Nashville singles
Music videos directed by Steven Goldmann
PolyGram singles